The 1991–92 Elitserien was the 58th season of the top division of Swedish handball. 12 teams competed in the league. The league was split into an autumn league and a spring league. The eight highest placed teams in the autumn league qualified for the spring league. Ystads IF won the regular season and also won the playoffs to claim their second Swedish title.

League tables

Autumn

Spring

Playoffs

Quarterfinals
IF Saab–Redbergslids IK 24–19, 15–20, 19–17 (IF Saab won series 2–1)
IK Sävehof–HK Drott 21–24, 21–22 (HK Drott won series 2–0)

Semifinals
Ystads IF–IF Saab 32–18, 17–19, 23–12 (Ystads IF won series 2–1)
IFK Skövde–HK Drott 25–21, 14–21, 21–24 (HK Drott won series 2–1)

Finals
Ystads IF–HK Drott 25–19, 24–16, 24–18 (Ystads IF won series 3–0)

References 

Swedish handball competitions